Christine Bell, FBA, FRSE, is a legal scholar, specialising in human rights law. As of 2018, she is Professor of Constitutional Law and Assistant Principal (Global Justice) at the University of Edinburgh. Bell graduated from Selwyn College, Cambridge, with her undergraduate law degree in 1988, before completing a master of laws degree at Harvard University in 1990. She qualified as a Barrister in that year and, after passing the New York bar examination, she worked at Debevoise & Plimpton. She was then Director of the Centre for International and Comparative Human Rights Law at Queen's University Belfast from 1997 to 1999, and then Professor of Public International Law at the University of Ulster from 2000 to 2011. One of Bell's most notable contributions is the concept of the lex pacificatoria.

Honours 
In 2015, Bell was elected a Fellow of the British Academy (FBA), the United Kingdom's national academy for the humanities and social sciences. In 2019 she was elected a Fellow of the Royal Society of Edinburgh.

Selected works 

 (With John Morison) Tall Stories?: Reading Law and Literature (Dartmouth Publishing, 1996).
 (With Marie Fox) Learning Legal Skills (Blackstone Press, 1999).
 Peace Agreements and Human Rights (Oxford University Press, 2000).
 On the Law of Peace: Peace Agreements and the Lex Pacificatoria (Oxford University Press, 2008)
 (With Vanessa Utley) Chronology of Mindanao Peace Agreements (Political Settlements Research Programme, 2015).
 (With Helia Farahnoosh) Chronology of the Peace Process and Peace Agreements between the Philippines and the National Democratic Front (Political Settlements Research Programme, 2015).
 (With Catherine O'Rourke and Sissela Matzner) A Chronology of Colombian Peace Processes and Peace Agreements (Political Settlements Research Programme, 2015).
 (With Celia Davies, Kimana Zulueta-Fuelscher, Asanga Welikala and Sumit Bisarya) Interim Constitutions in Post-Conflict Settings (International Idea, 2015).
 Governance and Law: The Distinctive Context of Transitions from Conflict and its Consequences for Development Interventions (Political Settlements Research Programme, 2015)
 Unsettling Bargains?: Power-sharing and the Inclusion of Women in Peace Negotiations (Political Settlements Research Programme, 2015).
 Text and Context: Evaluating Peace Agreements for their "Gender Perspective" (Political Settlements Research Programme, 2015).
 (With Jenna Sapiano, Kimana Zulueta-Fülscher, Sumit Bisarya and Asanga Welikala) Constitution-Building in Political Settlement Processes: The Quest for Inclusion (International Idea, 2016).
 Transitional Justice (Routledge, 2016).
 (With Kimana Zulueta-Fuelscher) Sequencing Peace Agreements and Constitutions in the Political Settlement Process (International Institute for Democracy and Electoral Assistance, 2016).

References 

Living people
British legal scholars
Alumni of Selwyn College, Cambridge
Harvard Law School alumni
Academics of Queen's University Belfast
Academics of Ulster University
Academics of the University of Edinburgh
Fellows of the British Academy
Women legal scholars
Year of birth missing (living people)
Fellows of the Royal Society of Edinburgh